Keriako Tobiko is a Kenyan Cabinet Secretary for Environment. As a lawyer by profession, he previously served as the Director of Public Prosecutions of Kenya. , he is a Cabinet Secretary of Environment. He previously served as a commissioner on the Constitution of Kenya Review Commission, where his differences with its then chair Yash Pal Ghai would later come back to haunt him, as Ghai made presentations against his confirmation as DPP over alleged involvement in a land grabbing cover up. Ghai also alleged that Tobiko's initial appointment to the office of Director of Public Prosecution was politically motivated.

See also
 Director of Public Prosecutions of Kenya

References

Year of birth missing (living people)
Living people
21st-century Kenyan lawyers